The Ngounié River (also Ngunyé) is a river flowing through southwest-central Gabon. It is the last and second most important tributary of the Ogooué River, the first being the Ivindo River. It initially flows down from the Chaillu Mountains, along the border with Congo, and then turns northwest, flowing through the towns of Fougamou, Sindara and Mouila before flowing into the Ogooué.

Etymology
The river name, Ngounié, is a French rewording of "Ngugni", which was originally used by Vili language speakers in the Samba Falls/Imperatrice Falls area in the mid-1800s to call the northern border of their district, "Nsina-Ngugni". When Robert Bruce Napoleon Walker and Paul Du Chaillu arrived in the area, they wrote down "Ngouyai" or "Ngunyé". The Gisir and Punu language speakers of Gabon know the river as "Durembu-du-Manga", while the Apindji, Eviya and Tsogo speakers know it as Otembo-a-Manga. The Kele speakers know it as "Melembye-a-Manga". The first part of these names means "body of water" in the given languages, and "manga" refers to dwarf palm trees which grow along its bank.

Geography

It rises in the Chaillu Mountains. For , the river has a south and then west flow, and forms a border with Congo. At the Polo River confluence, it changes direction, heading northwest, before passing through three waterfalls. It then establishes a floodplain within a  valley between the Moukande Mountains and the Massif due Chaillu. Development in the floodplain occurs mostly in the areas between Lébamba and Mouila, and again from the Fougamou area to the Ogooué at Lambarene. The left bank is characterized by sandy clay soils.

The Ngounié River Valley is formed between the forest-covered Du Chaillu Hills and the Ikoundou Mountains, and has grassy vegetation. The region within this valley is also known as Ngounié.

Its tributaries include Louetsié, which passes through Lébamba and Mbigou; Ikoy, whose main tributary are the Ikobe River and the Oumba River; Dollé, which passes through Ndendé; as well as the Ogoulou, Ngongo and Ovigui rivers. They are located in a river bend in the Ngounié Province,  from Fougamou. This is within the Peneplain Chaillu, which features granite gneiss and hills as well as rocky bays.

Climate
The climate is characterized by its equatorial humidity. The relative humidity is commonly greater than 80%. Wet seasons occur during September–December and March–May.

Power development
The hydro-power potential of the Ngounié River has been proposed to be tapped by a hydroelectric project located on the Empress Eugénie Falls. The project is planned as a 56 MW run-of-the-river scheme with four units 14 MW capacity each. Two additional units of 14 MW have also been planned for completion in 2015, thus taking the total installed capacity of the station to 84 MW. The geology in the project area consists of granite gneiss formations.

References

Bibliography
 National Geographic. 2003. African Adventure Atlas Pg 24,72. led by Sean Frase

Rivers of Gabon
Ogooué River
Ngounié Province